Roman Serov (born 16 December 1976 in Moscow) is a Russian-born figure skater and skating coach who has also competed for Israel. He won two medals on the Grand Prix series and is a two-time Israeli national champion.

Career 
Serov represented Russia until 2001–2002, twice placing 4th at the Russian Championships and winning medals at Cup of Russia and Finlandia Trophy. After his marriage to an Israeli, he decided to represent Israel and sat out the mandatory wait period, returning to international competition in 2003. Serov represented Israel at the 2005 & 2006 European and World Figure Skating Championships. He was removed from Israel's list of candidates for the 2006 Olympics because he did not hold Israeli citizenship, nor meet residency requirements.

Following his retirement from competition, Serov began working as a coach. He worked with Georgian figure skater Elene Gedevanishvili. Serov is currently based at the Ice House Arena in Hackensack, New Jersey.

Personal life 
Serov married skater Rachel Lior in August 2004, and they had a daughter in 2006. They divorced in 2007. Serov married Anna Zadorozhniuk in 2011.

Programs

Results

References

External links

 
 Roman Serov at Tracings
 Roman Serov at sport-folio.net

Russian male single skaters
Israeli male single skaters
Living people
1976 births
Figure skaters from Moscow
Universiade medalists in figure skating
Universiade gold medalists for Russia
Medalists at the 2001 Winter Universiade
Competitors at the 1999 Winter Universiade